Sanctuary is a Canadian science fiction television series. The show was created by long-time Stargate franchise writer Damian Kindler. The first episodes were released as webisodes, the Sci Fi Channel eventually picked up the series and broadcast season one in 2008. Season one featured the re-work of old webisodes so that the plot would be easier to understand for new viewers. As of December 2009, Syfy renewed the series for a third season.

Sanctuary has been nominated a total of 47 awards in its first two-year run, twelve of which were won. The series won the majority of them at the Leo Awards, having earned eleven wins, and a further sixteen nominations. The other was awarded from the 2009 Gemini Awards with five other nominations. It also earned another fourteen nominations, including an Emmy and twelve Constellation Awards.

Constellation Awards 
To date, Sanctuary has been nominated for 12 Constellation Awards. In 2009, Sanctuary was nominated for six Constellation Awards, but none of those resulted in a win. In 2010, the series was nominated for a further six, with results pending.

Directors Guild of Canada Awards 
In July 2010, the series was nominated for a Directors Guild of Canada Award.

Emmy Awards 
Sanctuary received a Primetime Emmy Award nomination in 2009.

Gemini Awards 
Sanctuary has been nominated for six Gemini Awards for it 24th ceremony, it has won one award with other results pending for 14 November 2009.

Leo Awards 
Sanctuary was nominated for ten Leo Awards in 2009; four of which were won. In 2010, the series received seven wins out of seventeen nominations. In 2011, the series received another seventeen nominations, winners of the 2011 Leo Awards will be announced on June 11, 2011 at the Gala Awards Ceremony.

References 

Sanctuary
Awards